Cymbiola imperialis, the imperial volute, is a species of sea snail, a marine gastropod mollusk of the genus Cymbiola in the family Volutidae, the volutes.

Subspecies
 C. imperialis robinsona Burch, 1954 (Robinson's volute, southern Philippines)

Description
These large and glossy shells are elongate and fusiform, light to heavy in weight. The basic color is whitish. The spire is high, with canaliculate sutures, strong red-brown axial ribs and narrow red-brown spiral lines. The aperture is whitish, elongate-ovate, with the outer lip showing many black denticles. The operculum is dark brown, thick and small.

Distribution
This species can be found in the Philippines, Sulu Sea.

References

Bibliography
 A. P. H. Oliver, James Nicholls The Hamlyn Guide to Shells of the World paperback 
 A. Robin Encyclopedia of Marine Gastropods
 Alan Hinton Shells of New Guinea and the Central Indo-Pacific
 Bail P. & Poppe G.T. 2001. A conchological iconography: a taxonomic introduction of the recent Volutidae. ConchBooks, Hackenheim. 30 pp, 5 pl.
 Doute, Harald Volutes, the Doute collection
 Graham Saunders Spotter's Guide to Shells: An Introduction to Seashells of the World 1st American edition
 Jerome M. Eisenberg A Collector's Guide to Seashells of the World
 Kenneth R. Wye Encyclopedia of Shells
 Masuoki Horikoshi Sea Shells of the World Japanese edition (Japanese) paperback – 1989
 R.Tucker Abbott & S. Peter Dance Compendium of Seashells 2nd printing 1983 revision
 Springsteen, F and F. M. Leobrera Shells of the Philippines

External links

 Conchology
 The Sea Shells

Volutidae
Gastropods described in 1786
Molluscs of the Philippines